Curt Jones may refer to:

Curt Jones, inventor of Dippin' Dots
Curt Jones (musician) in Aurra and Slave (band)

See also
Curtis Jones (disambiguation)